Abdul Ali Mustaghni (1875-1933) was an Afghan poet. He is one of the most influential poets in modern Persian literature. He was named as the "founder of Pashto modern literature of the country" by President Hamid Karzai.

References

1875 births
1933 deaths
19th-century Afghan poets
Pashto-language poets